Girolamo Riggio (died 1589) was a Roman Catholic priest who served as Prelate of Santa Lucia del Mela (1585–1589).

Biography
In 1585, Girolamo Riggio was appointed by Pope Sixtus V as Prelate of Santa Lucia del Mela. He served as Prelate of Santa Lucia del Mela until his death in 1589.

References

External links and additional sources
 (for Chronology of Bishops) 
 (for Chronology of Bishops) 

1589 deaths
16th-century Roman Catholic bishops in Sicily